The Cartography of Dublin is the history of surveying and creation of maps of the city of Dublin in Ireland. The following is a list of notable historical maps of Dublin City and County Dublin.

References

External links
 http://www.logainm.ie/eolas/Data/IHTA/dublin-2.pdf
 http://libguides.ucd.ie/mapshistDublin
 http://gis.sdublincoco.ie/historical_mapping/map_descriptions.html
 https://web.archive.org/web/20120203092223/http://gis.sdublincoco.ie/historical_mapping/ – South Dunblin CoCo area – online maps for Roque (1760), Taylor (1816), Duncan (1821), First Edition OS Maps (1843), Third Edition OS Maps (1911–12), Fourth Edition OS Maps (1935–38), GSGS 3906 (1940) and GSGS 4136 (1942).
Maps of Dublin accompanying Thom's Official Directory, printed by the Ordnance Survey for the Dublin publisher Alexander Thom from the six-inch map sheets 18 and 22, and dating from the late 19th century. A UCD Digital Library Collection.

History of Dublin (city)
Maps of Ireland
Dublin
Dublin